"Money" and "Kill Me" are two songs by the Liverpool-based Indie rock band Space, released together as a double A-side in November 1995. As their debut for Gut Records, it is also the first single to be released from their debut album, Spiders The track did not chart in the UK. "Money" was re-recorded for Spiders with a more bombastic sound.

Track listings 

 CD:
 "Money" (7" Radio Edit)
 "Kill Me" (7" Radio Edit) 
 "Money" (Space Club Mix)
 "Kill Me" (Space Club Mix)

 '12:
 "Money" (Space Club Mix)
 "Kill Me" (Space Club Mix)
 "Money" (7" Radio Edit)
 "Kill Me" (7" Radio Edit)

References

External links 
"Money"/"Kill Me" article

Space (English band) songs
1995 singles
1995 songs